Max Weber (born 9 August 1964 in Obergünzburg) is a German paralympic cyclist. He competed in cycling events at the 2000, 2008, 2012 and 2016 Summer Paralympics, winning the silver medal in the men's road race HC B event in 2008, and another silver medal in 2016 in the men's road race H3 event.

References

External links 
 
 
 

1964 births
Living people
German male cyclists
Paralympic medalists in cycling
Paralympic cyclists of Germany
Paralympic silver medalists for Germany
Cyclists at the 2000 Summer Paralympics
Cyclists at the 2008 Summer Paralympics
Cyclists at the 2012 Summer Paralympics
Cyclists at the 2016 Summer Paralympics
Medalists at the 2008 Summer Paralympics
Medalists at the 2016 Summer Paralympics
People from Ostallgäu
Sportspeople from Swabia (Bavaria)
Cyclists from Bavaria